Nidhivan which means "Forest of Tulsi " is one of the sacred forest sites of Vrindavan. It is situated in the Mathura district, Uttar Pradesh, India. Nidhivan is considered as the most prominent site dedicated to the pastimes of Hindu deities Radha Krishna and their gopis. It is the common belief among devotees that Nidhivan still witnesses the Raslila (dance) of Radha and Krishna during night time and thus, nobody is allowed to stay inside the premises of Nidhivan at night.

The site has numerous Tulsi (Basil) plants which are short in height but found in pairs and have entangled trunks. Besides Tulsi plants, the premises houses a palace called "Rang Mahal" where it is believed that Radha Krishna spend their night after raslila, a temple called "Bansichor Radha" where Radha has stolen the flute of Krishna, a shrine dedicated to Swami Haridas who with his complete devotion made the idol of Banke Bihari appeared, Raas Leela Sthali where Raslila is performed and Lalita Kund which was believed to be made by Krishna himself when gopis asked for water amidst of Raslila.

Legends

Tulsi Plants 
Nidhivan is considered as one of the mysterious places of Vrindavan. It is a dense forest with the lush green trees. The interesting thing is that the barks of the trees are hollow and the land is absolutely dry, but the tree remains loaded with green leaves throughout the year. All the trees are in bending position towards the ground. The common belief is that these trees of Tulsi turn into gopis in the night for performing Raslila. Every Tulsi plant in the premises are found in pairs signifying the pair of Gopi and Krishna.

Rang Mahal 
Rang Mahal is another temple in Nidhivan, known as the place where Radha Rani is adorned by Krishna with his own hands. It is strongly believed by devotees that every night Radha Krishna themselves come to this palace to take rest. The temple has sandalwood beds for resting. Every evening, before closing the temple gates, the temple priests makes the bed, places ornaments like bangles, flowers and clothes for RadhaRani, leaves Neem Twigs (for brushing teeth), Sweets, Paan (Betel leaves) and a jar full of water beside the bed of Radha Krishna. After all the arrangements done by priests, the main door of the Rang Mahal and Nidhivan are locked from outside and unlocked only in the morning. But every morning, they found that the bed looks as if it has been slept in, Neem twigs looks used and Sweets and Betel leaves looks partially eaten by someone. Also, the bangles, flowers and clothes placed for Radharani looks disordered and disarranged.

No one is allowed inside the premises of the temple after the sun sets down. It is believed that Radha-Krishna come to the temple every night to rest. Anyone who has tried to see what happens in the night either dies, goes blind or lose their mental balance. Although the houses built in the vicinity of Nidhivan have access to the view of the area but no one dares to attempt to do so. Many people who live in the vicinity have sealed their windows with bricks and those who have an open window, also closes them down after the final bell of the evening aarti. Many of them also claimed to hear the sounds of anklet coming from Nidhivan in night. Even the monkeys leave the Nidhivan temple after evening aarti.

Appearance of Banke Bihari 
Nidhivan is also considered as the place of appearance of Banke Bihari. It is said that Vrindavan saint Swami Haridas with his sheer devotion and dedication pleased the divine couple Radha Krishna and they appeared in front of him. Later, both Radha and Krishna combined into one single form called Banke Bihari to stay with Haridas Thakur. For few years, Banke Bihari was worshiped in Nidhivan and then they were enshrined in separate temple and the temple is named Banke Bihari Temple.

Gallery

Timings 
The time zone (UTC+05:30) observed through India by the priest.

Summer Timings -  05:00 am to 08:00 pm.

Winter Timings    -  06:00 am to 07:00 pm.

Nearby attractions 

 Seva Kunj
 Banke Bihari Temple
 Radha Raman Temple
 Radha Damodar Temple
 Radha Gopinath Temple
 Radha Vallabh Temple

See also 

 Gopis
 Raslila
 Prem Mandir
 Radha Krishna
 Radha Rani Temple
 Krishna Balrama Temple
 Radha Madan Mohan Temple
 Radha Krishna Vivah Sthali, Bhandirvan

References

External Links 
 https://timesofindia.indiatimes.com/travel/destinations/do-you-know-about-the-mysterious-nidhivan-in-vrindavan-where-krishna-still-performs-raasleela/as65654845.cms
 https://kalingatv.com/features/nidhivan-the-mystery-land-where-krishna-rasleela-happens-every-night/

Hindu temples in Mathura district
Radha Krishna temples
Vrindavan
Tourist attractions in Mathura district